Cibotogaster is a genus of flies in the family Stratiomyidae.

Species
Cibotogaster argentihirta Brunetti, 1923
Cibotogaster auricollis (Brunetti, 1907)
Cibotogaster azurea (Gerstaecker, 1857)
Cibotogaster enderleini Kertész, 1914
Cibotogaster fumipennis Kertész, 1914
Cibotogaster kerteszii Krivosheina, 1992
Cibotogaster varia (Walker, 1854)
Cibotogaster walkeri James, 1975

References

Stratiomyidae
Brachycera genera
Taxa named by Günther Enderlein
Diptera of Asia